Klöntalersee is a natural lake in the canton of Glarus, Switzerland and covers the major part of the  valley floor. Since 1908, it has been used as a reservoir for electricity production. The dam's construction substantially increased the lake's volume.

Klöntalersee is drained by the Löntsch, a left tributary of the Linth.

See also
List of lakes of Switzerland
List of mountain lakes of Switzerland

External links

Lakes of the canton of Glarus
Lakes of Switzerland
LKlontalersee